Kang Jun (born 2 March 1990) is a Chinese badminton player. In 2013, he reach the semi final round at the Japan Open partnered with Liu Cheng. In 2014, he and Liu won the China Masters Grand Prix Gold tournament.

Achievements

BWF Grand Prix 
The BWF Grand Prix had two levels, the Grand Prix and Grand Prix Gold. It was a series of badminton tournaments sanctioned by the Badminton World Federation (BWF) and played between 2007 and 2017.

Men's doubles

  BWF Grand Prix Gold tournament
  BWF Grand Prix tournament

BWF International Challenge/Series 
Men's doubles

  BWF International Challenge tournament
  BWF International Series tournament

References

External links 
 

1990 births
Living people
Badminton players from Jiangsu
Chinese male badminton players
21st-century Chinese people